Simplicia erebina is a species of litter moth of the  family Erebidae. It is found in Papua New Guinea and Australia (including Queensland).

References

Moths described in 1887
Herminiinae